Little Qualicum Falls Provincial Park is a provincial park in British Columbia, Canada, on central Vancouver Island, that encompasses the entire southern shore of Cameron Lake. The Island Rail Corridor line to Port Alberni passes through the park.

History
Little Qualicum Falls Provincial Park was originally established as a park in 1940 to protect the old growth Douglas Fir forest.

Activities
Swimming, fishing, campgrounds and day-use areas are available within the park, as well as sail boarding due to a wind funnel created by the surrounding mountains, Mount Wesley to the north and Mount Arrowsmith to the south. The park maintains 6 km of walking trails within its perimeter.

See also
Mount Arrowsmith Biosphere Region

References

Official BC Government Park website
British Columbia Tourism website
vislandcamping.com review

External links

Photo of Little Qualicum Falls, undated, U.Wash Digital Collections
Little Qualicum Falls Loop, hiking guide

Regional District of Nanaimo
Provincial parks of British Columbia
Waterfalls of British Columbia
Mid Vancouver Island
1940 establishments in British Columbia
Protected areas established in 1940